Frauke Köhler (born 1983) is a German lawyer. She is public prosecutor at the Federal Court of Justice (Bundesgerichtshof, BGH) in Karlsruhe, Germany. She also heads the press department and is spokesperson of Germany's Public Prosecutor General at the BGH. There she communicates the results of the investigations to press representatives in all serious state protection matters which are particularly sensitive to internal or external security in Germany.

References

External links 
 Official website

Prosecutors
1983 births
Living people